Beyond the Martyrs: A Social History of Chicago's Anarchists, 1870–1900 is a 1988 history of anarchism in Chicago written by Bruce C. Nelson and published by Rutgers University Press.

References

External links 

 

1988 non-fiction books
English-language books
History books about anarchism
History books about the 19th century
History books about the United States
Rutgers University Press books
Works about the Haymarket affair